is a Japanese ice hockey defender.

International career

Takeuchi was selected for the Japan women's national ice hockey team in the 2014 Winter Olympics. She played in all five games, recording one assist.

Takeuchi also played for Japan in the qualifying event for the 2014 Winter Olympics.

Takeuchi competed at the 2018 Winter Olympics.

As of 2015, Takeuchi has also appeared for Japan at two IIHF Women's World Championships, with the first in 2012.

Takeuchi made one appearance for the Japan women's national under-18 ice hockey team at the IIHF World Women's U18 Championships, in 2009.

CWHL
Takeuchi was drafted by the Calgary Inferno in the 2015 CWHL Draft. Appearing with the Inferno in the 2016 Clarkson Cup finals, she joined teammate Kanae Aoki as the first women from Japan to win the Clarkson, as the Inferno prevailed in a convincing 8–3 final against Les Canadiennes de Montreal.

Career statistics

International career
Through 2014–15 season

References

External links
 
 
 
 

1991 births
Living people
Japanese women's ice hockey defencemen
Calgary Inferno players
Clarkson Cup champions
Olympic ice hockey players of Japan
Ice hockey players at the 2014 Winter Olympics
Ice hockey players at the 2018 Winter Olympics
Asian Games medalists in ice hockey
Asian Games gold medalists for Japan
Ice hockey players at the 2017 Asian Winter Games
Medalists at the 2017 Asian Winter Games
Sportspeople from Tokyo
People from Musashino, Tokyo